Chris Bauman is a Canadian football wide receiver-slotback for the Calgary Stampeders of the Canadian Football League (CFL). He was drafted first overall by the Hamilton Tiger-Cats in the 2007 CFL Draft and spent four seasons with the team before joining the Eskimos. He played CIS football for the Regina Rams and was the first player from the University of Regina to be selected first overall in the CFL Draft.

Amateur career
Bauman played four seasons for the University of Regina Rams in the CIS. Prior to playing for the Rams, he suited up for the Winnipeg Rifles of the Canadian Junior Football League in 2003 and played football at Vincent Massey High School in Brandon.

Professional career
Bauman was the first overall pick of the 2007 CFL Draft.  During his rookie season in the CFL, he had 30 receptions for 370 yards.

On February 1, 2011, Bauman was released by the Tiger-Cats, two weeks before he was set to become a free agent. Soon after, he signed with the Edmonton Eskimos and spent one year with them before being released on January 12, 2012.

Bauman was then signed by the Calgary Stampeders on January 19, 2012.

References

External links
Calgary Stampeders bio

1984 births
Living people
Canadian football wide receivers
Calgary Stampeders players
Edmonton Elks players
Hamilton Tiger-Cats players
Players of Canadian football from Manitoba
Regina Rams players
Sportspeople from Brandon, Manitoba